Established in 1886 as the Excelsior Marine Benevolent Association, in 1893 changed its name to Ship Masters' Association. This was a society among members of the profession, where in case of death of a member the widow or beneficiary would receive $100.00.

References

External links
 International Shipmasters Association (Official Site)

Seafarers' trade unions

Trade unions established in 1886